American Virgin may refer to:

American Virgin (2000 film), a 2000 film starring Mena Suvari
American Virgin (2009 film), a 2009 comedy film starring Rob Schneider
American Virgin (comics), a Vertigo comic book series by Steven T. Seagle and Becky Cloonan

See also
United States Virgin Islands, a group of islands in the Caribbean
Virgin America, an airline